Sri Kunj Bihari Temple is a Hindu house of worship in George Town, Penang, Malaysia. It is the oldest North Indian Temple in Penang dedicated to Krishna, with Kunj Bihari (कुंज बिहारी) being one of his many names.

History 
Among residents of Penang, this temple is also known as Krishna Mandir or Thakorwadi. The earliest version of the structure is believed to have been built on this spot in the 1830s. It was built with an endowment from Hindus in Bihar, North India.

During the foundation years of George Town's urban development, the area favoured by North Indian traders was around Beach, Bishop, Penang and Chulia Streets. However, this temple is further west, along Penang Road, in an area which was then more associated with Malarbri Indians from the south.

A religious centre 
Sri Kunj Bihari Temple serves as a Hindu religious centre for the Bengali, Gujerati, Punjabi and Sindhi people of Penang.
The Temple is administered by The Penang Hindu Endowments Board (PHEB). The current Commissioner of the Temple is Markend D Joshi. The nearby Sri Bahari Road takes its name from this temple, although the spelling is slightly different.

References

External links 
 Sri Kunj Bihari Temple on the website of the Hindu Endowments Board

Hindu temples in Malaysia
Religious buildings and structures in Penang
Tourist attractions in George Town, Penang